Anhoniyon Ka Andhera is an Indian television horror series that premiered on 26 February 2011 on Colors. It ended on 9 July 2011. The series is produced by Bollywood film producer Vikram Bhatt, and each story of the show revolves around Anahita Malik, a girl who has supernatural powers. Vikram Bhatt film Haunted 3D stars Mahaakshay Chakraborty and Tia Bajpai also made their appearance on 30 April 2011 to promote their film.

Cast
Anita Hassanandani ... Anahita
Ajay Chaudhary ... Rohan
Nayan Bhatt ... Veteran
Mohit Malhotra

References

External links

Colors TV original programming
Indian horror fiction television series
2011 Indian television series debuts
2011 Indian television series endings